This article is about events in the year 2021 in Madagascar

Incumbents 
 President: Andry Rajoelina
 Prime Minister: Christian Ntsay

Events 
Ongoing – COVID-19 pandemic in Madagascar
11 February – Roman Catholic priest Pedro Opeka is nominated for a Nobel Peace Prize for his work with the poor in Antananarivo.
17 September - Suspected criminals, known locally as Dahalo, attacked the villages of Ambohitsohy and Vohitsimbe in Marovitsika Commune, Befotaka Atsi Region. The incidents involved up to 120 assailants. At least 46 people were killed in the clashes, including 42 suspected Dahalo and four villagers. The motive for the incident is not clear; however, attacks have been linked to cultural practices involving cattle rustling.
20 December - 2021 Madagascar shipwreck

Scheduled events

Sports
16 January – It was announced that Madagascar will organize the 2023 Indian Ocean Islands Games since the Seychelles has withdrawn.

Deaths
28 March — Didier Ratsiraka, Former President of Madagascar

See also

2021 in East Africa
COVID-19 pandemic in Africa
2021–22 South-West Indian Ocean cyclone season
International Organization of Francophone countries (OIF)

References 

 
Madagascar
Madagascar
2020s in Madagascar
Years of the 21st century in Madagascar